Henri Laugier (1888-1973) was a French scholar. He served as the president of the French National Centre for Scientific Research from 1939 to 1940 and from 1943 to 1944.

Early life
Henri Laugier was born on 15 August 1888. He studied medicine, but dropped out of university to serve in the First World War. After the war, he returned to university and received a PhD.

Career
Laugier started his career as a researcher for the Fondation Dosne-Thiers. He taught Physiology of Work at the Conservatoire national des arts et métiers from 1930 to 1937. He became Assistant Professor at the University of Paris in 1937. He worked for Minister Yvon Delbos in 1938. At the outset of World War II, he left for Montreal, Quebec, Canada, and subsequently French Algeria.

Laugier served as the president of the French National Centre for Scientific Research from 1939 to 1940 and from 1943 to 1944.

Laugier was appointed as the Assistant-Secretary-General for Social Affairs at the United Nations in 1946. During his period in office, he was involved in the process of drafting the Universal Declaration of Human Rights, having opened the preparatory meeting of the Commission on Human Rights.

Death
Laugier died in 1973.

References

1888 births
1973 deaths
French military personnel of World War I
Academic staff of the University of Paris
Under-Secretaries-General of the United Nations
French officials of the United Nations